Lechatelierite is silica glass, amorphous SiO2, non-crystalline mineraloid.

Structure
Lechatelierite is a mineraloid as it does not have a crystal structure. Although not a true mineral, it is often classified in the quartz mineral group.

Formation
One common way in which lechatelierite forms naturally is by very high temperature melting of quartz sand during a lightning strike. The result is an irregular, branching, often foamy hollow tube of silica glass called a fulgurite.  Not all fulgurites are lechatelierite; the original sand must be nearly pure silica.

Lechatelierite also forms as the result of high pressure shock metamorphism during meteorite impact cratering and is a common component of a type of glassy ejecta called tektites. Most tektites are blobs of impure glassy material, but tektites from the Sahara Desert in Libya and Egypt, known as Libyan desert glass, are composed of almost pure silica that is almost pure lechatelierite. High pressure experiments have shown that shock pressures of 85 GPa are needed to produce lechatelierite in quartz grains embedded in granite.

Lechatelierite was formed during the impact of a meteorite into a layer of Coconino Sandstone at Meteor Crater in Arizona. During the rapid pressure reduction following the impact, steam expanded the newly formed lechatelierite. The shattered and expanded glass has a density less than that of water.

Lechatelierite may also form artificially, a unique example being the trinitite produced by melting of quartz sand at the first nuclear bomb explosion at Trinity Flats, White Sands, New Mexico.

References

Impact event minerals
Glass in nature